Moonstone may refer to:

 Moonstone (gemstone), a sodium potassium aluminium silicate

Arts and entertainment

Fictional entities
 Moonstone, Colorado, a town in The Song of the Lark by Willa Cather
 Moonstone (comics), the name of two Marvel Comics universe characters
 Moonstone, a plot element in season 2 of The Vampire Diaries
 Moonstone Opal, a plot element in Tangled The Series
 Moonstone, a setting in Erin Hunter's Warriors story arc
 Moonstone, an artifact in the Lone Wolf gamebooks

Film and television
 The Moonstone (1909 film), by William Nicholas Selig, probably lost
 The Moonstone (1915 film), by Frank Hall Crane
 The Moonstone (1934 film), by Reginald Barker
 The Moonstone (1996 film), a TV film
 The Moonstone (1959 TV series), a British miniseries
 The Moonstone (1972 TV series), a British miniseries
 The Moonstone (2016 TV series), a British miniseries
 "Moonstone" (The Outer Limits), a 1964 episode

Other uses in arts and entertainment
 The Moonstone, an 1868 book by Wilkie Collins
 "Moonstone", a song by Cat Stevens from the 1967 album New Masters
 Moonstone: A Hard Days Knight, a 1991 computer game
 The Moonstones, a Sri Lankan band

Businesses
 Moonstone (company), a Japanese visual novel studio
 Moonstone (imprint), an imprint of HarperCollins
 Moonstone Books, an American publisher

Places
 Moonstone, Ontario, Canada
 Mount St. Louis Moonstone, a ski resort
 Moonstone, California, U.S.
 Moonstone Beach, a former tourist attraction in Redondo Beach, California, U.S.
 Moonstone Beach, a beach in Cambria, California, U.S.

Other uses
 Moonstone (horse), an Irish Thoroughbred racehorse and broodmare
 Lunar Society Moonstones, a set of sandstone memorials to members of the Lunar Society
 , a WWII U.S. Navy patrol yacht
 , a WWII British Royal Navy armed trawler
 Moonstone Records, a record label
 Pachyphytum oviferum, succulent plant known as moonstone
 Sandakada pahana or Moonstone, carved semi-circular stone slabs in Sri Lanka
 Moonstone, UK National Lottery number selection machine
 Moonstone, a 1991 Performing Arts Festival 
 Moonstones, distinctively Latter Day Saint motifs in Nauvoo Temple

See also